Anau (also spelled Annau) is a city in Turkmenistan. Until 20 December 2022 it was the capital of Ahal Province. It is situated 8 km southeast of Ashgabat, to which it is connected via the M37 highway.

Etymology
The name Anau derives from Persian Âbe nav (آب نو), meaning "fresh water".

Overview
The city built a new stadium in 2003 and the National White Wheat Museum in 2005 to house artifacts recovered from the area.

The city was designated "Cultural Capital of the Turkic World" for 2024 at the 39th session of the Permanent Council of Ministers of Culture of TURKSOY.

Archaeology

The Chalcolithic Anau culture dates to 4500 BC, following the Neolithic Jeitun culture in the cultural sequence of southern Turkmenistan.

Anau was excavated by a joint Turkmen-U.S. archaeological expedition in the 1990s and 2000s. Anau was a stopping point along the ancient Silk Road. Fine painted pottery is found here.

Notable people 

 Byagul Nurmiradova, Turkmen politician

References

External links

ANAW (Anau) iranicaonline.org

Populated places in Ahal Region
Archaeological sites in Turkmenistan